Cryphalogenes euphorbiae, is a species of weevil found in Sri Lanka.

Description
Similar to much smaller species Cryphalogenes exiguus. Length of the male is about 1.2 to 1.4 mm. Body dark brown. Frons broadly convex. Surface largely reticulate, and feebly granulate moderate minute punctures. Antennal club slightly longer than scape. Pronotum with almost straight sides and parallel on basal third. Anterior margin of the pronotum armed by about four to six irregular, and poorly formed serrations. Vestiture of fine short, semirecumbent hair. Elytra long as pronotum and with almost straight sides. Elytral striae not impressed, each puncture largely replaced by a large rounded granule. Elytral interstriae as wide as striae, and smooth, shiny. Vestiture of rows of fine, short, strial hair and rows of erect interstrial scales.

References 

Curculionidae
Insects of Sri Lanka
Beetles described in 1980